Table tennis was contested at the 1966 Asian Games in Chula Student Union Hall, Chulalongkorn University, Bangkok, Thailand in December 1966.

Table tennis had team, doubles and singles events for men and women, as well as a mixed doubles competition.

Medalists

Medal table

References

 ITTF Database

External links
OCA official website

 
1966 Asian Games events
1966
Asian Games
1966 Asian Games